The 2011 Idol Star Championships in Athletics (Hangul: 아이돌스타 육상 선수권 대회), also known as "2011 Idol Athletics – Chuseok Special", was held at Mokdong Stadium in Seoul, South Korea on August 27, 2011 and was broadcast on MBC on September 13, 2011 (two episodes). At the championships a total number of 11 events in athletics were contested: 6 by men and 5 by women. There were a total number of 150 participating K-pop singers and celebrities, divided into 12 teams.

Results

Men

Women

Ratings

References

External links
2011 Idol Star Championships in Athletics official MBC website 

MBC TV original programming
South Korean variety television shows
South Korean game shows
2011 in South Korean television
Idol Star Athletics Championships